Turniptown Creek is a stream in the U.S. state of Georgia. It is a tributary to the Ellijay River.

Turniptown  is an English translation of the native Cherokee language name.

See also
List of rivers of Georgia (U.S. state)

References

Rivers of Gilmer County, Georgia
Rivers of Georgia (U.S. state)